A by-election was held in the state electoral district of Macquarie Fields on 3 November 1990. The by-election was triggered by the resignation of Stan Knowles, who was facing minor shop lifting charges.

Dates

Result	

	

Stan Knowles resigned.

See also
Electoral results for the district of Macquarie Fields
List of New South Wales state by-elections

References

1990 elections in Australia
New South Wales state by-elections
1990s in New South Wales